Zabłocie  is a village in the administrative district of Gmina Widawa, within Łask County, Łódź Voivodeship, in central Poland.

References

Villages in Łask County